Rogowiec  is a village in the administrative district of Gmina Kleszczów, within Bełchatów County, Łódź Voivodeship, in central Poland.

The village has a population of 50.

References

Villages in Bełchatów County